Deadman's Cay Airport  is an airport located near Deadman's Cay on Long Island in The Bahamas.  The airport serves Clarence Town on the island.

Facilities

Airlines and destinations

References

External links
 
 

Airports in the Bahamas
Long Island, Bahamas